Maesmore Morris (1868 – 31 August 1917) was an Australian cricketer. He played five first-class cricket matches for Victoria between 1888 and 1889.

See also
 List of Victoria first-class cricketers

References

External links
 

1868 births
1917 deaths
Australian cricketers
Victoria cricketers
Cricketers from Melbourne
People from Northcote, Victoria